Tasgaon Tasgaon is a city in Maharashtra and a municipal council in Sangli district in the Indian state of Maharashtra. Tasgaon city is developing city in Maharashtra. Tasgaon was given as Jahagir to Parshuram Bhau Tasgaonkar by Narayanrao Ballal Peshwa in 1774. Tasgaon Sansthan was lapsed by British during ruling of Shrimant Ganpatrao Tasgaonkar.

Tasgaon is famous for grapes and kishmish market of Tasgaon is famous in Maharashtra. The very good quality kishmish also available in Tasgaon market.Tasgaon grapes export in many country. Tasgaon is also known as grapes city. Tasgaon Ganpati temple is very beautiful and prestigious.

Geography
Tasgaon is one of the famous places in Maharashtra for grapes. Farmers develop many types of grapes bagicha (vineyards). It has an average elevation of 560 metres (1837 feet). Tasgaon receives average rainfall of 636 mm from monsoon.

Demographics
 India census, Tasgaon had a population of 37,945 including a suburb of about 49161. Males constitute 52% of the population and females 48%. Tasgaon has an average literacy rate of 88.02%, higher than the national average of 74.04%: male literacy is 92.98%, and female literacy is 82.87%. In Tasgaon, 10.47% of the population is under 6 years of age.

Grapes
The town is known for its grapes. Grapes are exported mainly to the UK, UAE, Singapore, Hong Kong, Sri Lanka, and Bangladesh. Among the best quality grapes are those from Tasgaon, which may grow to be as long as 3.5 inches. Production rate of grapes is as twice as large as in Nashik. Farmers operate many types of bagicha (vineyards).

Production of grapes is undertaken in the surrounding area with the help of water tankers. 10 km from Tasgaon City, Lokarewadi (also known as Nave Vadgaon) is the last village of Tasgaon taluka towards Kavathe-Mahankal. Kaulage and Lodhe Lake are known for sugarcane and grapes production, 12 km away from Tasgaon towards the east. In Manjarde (known for its Hanuman temple's Yatra festival of Hanuman Jayanti in the second week of April), Balgavde and Bastawde there is the production of sugarcane (15 km from Tasgaon City). Siddhewadi (Savlaj) is known for "lake" water used for irrigation, drinking.

Features
The Ganapati Temple in Tasgaon, which is older than 250 years, is unique as the trunk of Lord Ganesha is bent towards right and this idol is considered as Living Lord, always there to bless communities. The Lord Ganesha idol is in gold, weighing 125 kg. The Gopur (five story ancient construction as entrance to temple) of Ganesha Temple is the tallest (96 feet) in Maharashtra as these Gopur's are commonly seen in South India. Ganesh festival is celebrated with great enthusiasm. It is known for Ganesh's Rath Utsav a day after Ganesh Chaturthi. Viththal Sakharam Page former president of Vidhan Parishad and the founder of Rojgar Hami Yojana, hails from a village called Visapur.

Kavathe-Ekand: Biggest Firework Festival in India on Dashahara (Dasara) (7 km from Tasgaon on Sangli Road)

Savlaj: Savalsiddha Temple

 Siddhewadi (savalaj), Manerajuri, Gavhan & Vadgaon: Production of grapes with the help of water tanker (10 km from Tasgaon City)

Lokarewadi named as Nave Vadgaon is a last village of Tasgaon Taluka towards Kavathe Mahanka.

Kaulage  Lodhe lake, Sugarcane & grapes production.

Manjarde (Hanuman Temple-Yatra Festival of Hanuman jayanti in 2nd week of April), Balgavde & Bastawde: Production of Sugarcane (15 km from Tasgaon City). Siddhewadi (Savalaj) is known for the "lake" water used of that lake main for irrigation, drinking.

Visapur: Well known for Animal Fair (8 km from Tasgaon City).

Chinchani: (5 km from Tasgaon) Jagrut Yellama Goddess Mandir. A fair is held in the month of January every year. Village of former MLA Dinkar (Aaba) Patil & MP Sanjay Patil. A Dattuguru Mandir in Patil Mala. Chinchani is also known for its grapes. Nearly 30% of the farmers grow grapes in this village.

Wasumbe: Educational Centre.

Wayphale, Dahiwadi & Dongarsoni: Production of Grapes.
DAHIWADI: This village is also known for its grape production and its Sidhanath temple.

Khujgaon: Known for its Turmeric production until the 1980s.

Punadi (pundi): Chilimkhada (Big Cylindrical Stone). Victory place of Chauhan Rajputs (Chavan) over Muslim warriors. Siddheshwar & Jyotirling Yatra. (5 km from Tasgaon City).

Anjani: Village of late. Mr. R. R. Patil former dy.C.M. & former Home Minister of Maharashtra.

Aravde: Radhagopal Temple & home place of ISCON (10 km from Tasgaon)

Hatnur & Hatnoli: Honai Temple & Honai Hill where Shivaji Maharaj Surveyed for building fort.

Savarde: Bhavani Fair

Turchi: Training Centre of Maharashtra Police & Tasgaon Sugar Factory.

Jarandi: Village Jarandi is the last end of Tasgaon taluka towards Khanapur. It is situated at about 34 kilometers away from Tasgaon and very close to Karad-Vijapur state highway no. 78. Ancient name of this village was Matanapur which later changed to Jarandi. The temple  Shukrachari is located about 4 kilometers away from Jarandi among the hills. One of the few temples to the god Venkatesh in Maharashtra is in Jarandi.

Nagewadi: This hamlet is located at about 28 km from Tasgaon.  This village is recipient of Nirmal Gram Purskar (Award) in SANT GADAGE BABA GRAM SWACHATA ABHIYAN.  The state highway - Miraj–Pandharpur is 6 km away from Nagewadi.

Borgaon: Jagrut Siddheshwar Devsthan. Also known as "Pailwananche Borgaon"

Shirgaon (V): It is situated on Sangli-Vita Road (State Highway No. 10) at about 8.5 kilometers away from Tasgaon. There are many Freedom Fighters from this village.

Rajapur (V): It is situated on Yerala river near the Sangli- Ahmednagar Road (State Highway No. 60) at about 11 kilometers away from Tasgaon. This village is known for temples like Ganapathi, Balu Mama and Shankar.

yelavi: As with other villages in the area, this village is known for grape and sugar cane production.

Nimani:It is situated on the banks of Yerla River. It is well known for Hanuman temple, export grapes & sugarcane. Known for its Hanuman temple's Yatra festival of Hanuman Jayanti in April.

Ped  It is situated on Tasgaon Khanapur state highway at about 25 km from tasgaon and last village of tasgaon towards khanapur it is known for quality grape, turmeric and sugar cane production. It is also known for the shiddishwar temple and Biroba mandir.

Tourism
Honai Temple is located in Hatnur village in Tasgaon taluka. The distance from Tasgaon to Hatnur is 16 km. There is a temple of Goddess at a short distance from the village. The temple of the goddess is located on a hill with about 350 steps.  We can experience an atmosphere that will make the mind happy. Green bushes everywhere, lovely flowering trees and attractive wrestling arena. In Shravan, people visit the temple regularly. At that time the hill is green everywhere. Schools in the surrounding area come to Devi's hill for a picnic. The full moon of the month of Magh is celebrated by the Goddess. At that time, a large crowd of

Police Training School
Police Training School Turchi,Tasgaon.Tal. Tasgaon, Dist. Sangli is the second training school of Maharashtra Police after Nasik Police Training School.

Education institutes

Schools:
 Swami Ramanand Bharti Vidyamandir, Tasgaon.
 Anandsagar Public School and Junior College, Tasgaon.
 Champaben Wadilal Dyanmandir, Tasgaon.
 Guruvarya Dadoji Konddev Military School, Tasgaon.
 Ideal English School
 K R S Mane Patil Vidhyamandir, Visapur
 Shree Virbhadra Krushi Vidyalaya, Siddhewadi
 Shrimant Vinayakrao alias Babasaheb Patawardhan Kanya Prashala, Tasgaon
 Vasantrao Patil High School & Mahavidyalaya, Manjarde 
 Yashwant High School
Maharashtra Ratn V. S. Page Vidyaniketan Krishi Madhyamik Vidyalaya & Junior College Tasgaon
 Barister T K Shendage Vidyalaya and junior college, Ped
 Panchkroshi Vidyaniketan Nimani

Shri Panchkroshi Highschool and Junior College Borgaon
Santhome School Tasgaon

Academic Colleges:

 Padmabhushan Dr. Vasantraodada Patil Mahavidyalaya, Tasgaon
 Anandsagar Public School and Junior College, Tasgaon
 Eklavya College of Pharmacy, Vasumbe, Tasgaon
 Government ITI College, Tasgaon
 Government Residence Women Polytechnic, Tasgaon
 Institute of Management Computer Research Development, Wasumbe
 Loknete R. R. (Aaba) Patil Education Society's Arts Commerce Science (Agri) Jr college, siddhewadi
 Mahatma Gandhi Jr College Of Arts & Science, Savlaj
 Mahatma Gandhi Jr College, Savlaj
 Mahila Mahavidyalaya, Tasgaon
 R. R. Patil Mahavidhyalaya, Siddhewadi, Savlaj
 Shri Veerbhadra Krushi Vidyalaya Siddhewadi (SVKVS)
 Yerla Vidya Mandir Shala rajapur
 Vidyaniketan krishi madhyamik vidyalaya and Jr. college, Tasgaon
 Wakratunda Computers, Tasgaon

Transport 
 State HQ Mumbai is 400 km by road
 District HQ Sangli is 22 km by road
 Nearest railway junction Miraj is 25 km
 Kirloskarvadi (Palus), Bhilawadi (Palus) are nearby railway stations.
 Kirloskarvadi (Palus) airstrip 
 Pune is 250 km via Palus-Islampur-Karad
 Kolhapur is 70 km via Sangli-Kolhapur State highway
 Coastal city Malvan is 230 km via Kolhapur
 New Proposed National Highway- Manmad-Ahmadnagar-Daund-Baramati-Phaltan-Vita-Tasgaon-Kakadwadi- Belgaum (570 km)
 New Proposed National Highway- Guhagar-Karad-Palus-Tasgaon-Kavthe Mahankal-Jath- Vijapur (380 km)

References

Cities and towns in Sangli district
Talukas in Maharashtra